Olympiacos B.C. B Development Team (alternate names: Olympiacos II, Olympiacos 2), also known as Olympiacos B.C. B Piraeus Bank for sponsorship reasons, is the reserve team of the Greek EuroLeague basketball club Olympiacos Piraeus. The club is located in Neo Faliro, Piraeus, which is about 7.4 kilometers (4.6 miles) from Athens, Greece. The club's full name is Olympiacos Piraeus Basketball Club B Development Team. The team currently plays in the Greek A2 Basket League (Greek 2nd Division), which is the second-tier level of professional club basketball in Greece.

History
Olympiacos Basketball Club B, was founded as the reserve team of the Greek EuroLeague club Olympiacos Piraeus, in September 2019. The team was founded after the relegation of the senior Olympiacos team, from Greece's top-tier level Greek Basket League, down to the 2nd-tier level Greek A2 Basket League (Greek 2nd Division). That relegation was due to a punishment by the Hellenic Basketball Federation, for the senior team's forfeiture of several 2018–19 Greek League season and 2018–19 Greek Cup games. In response to that, the senior Olympiacos Piraeus team refused to play in any Greek competitions going forward. Therefore, the new Olympiacos B Development Team was formed, and it would compete in all Greek competitions instead.

For its inaugural season, the B Development team was registered into the Greek 2nd Division's 2019–20 season, taking the place of the club's senior team. The B Development team also took the senior team's place in the 2019–20 Greek Cup competition. While the senior Olympiacos team continued to function as a completely separate and different team, that competes only in the EuroLeague, which is Europe's premier continental-wide club competition. As a further punishment from the Hellenic Basketball Federation, the Olympiacos B Development Team had 6 points (3 wins) automatically deducted from their 2019–20 season's record, prior to the season's start.

For the team's first season, Dimitris Tsaldaris was hired as its first head coach, with Nikos Barlos working as his main assistant. The team's first player signings were Vangelis Tzolos, Andreas Petropoulos, Vassilis Christidis, Alexandros Nikolaidis, and Petros Noeas. The team played its first official game on 21 September 2019, in a 2019–20 Greek Cup game against Ermis Lagkada. Olympiacos B won the game, by a score of 64–58. On 3 October 2019, the club announced a naming sponsorship deal with Piraeus Bank.

Ultimately, in its inaugural season, Olympiacos B Development Team was eliminated at the Last 32 stage of the Greek Cup competition by Anatolia Thessaloniki, by a score of 91–76; and finished with a record of 17–4 in the Greek 2nd Division, which was the second best record in the league, behind only Charilaos Trikoupis' 19–2 record. However, due to the Hellenic Basketball Federation's punishment of a deduction of 6 points (3 wins), the team was dropped down to a sixth place finish in the league's final standings.

Arena
Olympiacos Basketball Club B plays its home games at the Peace and Friendship Stadium's Training Facility, which is located in Neo Faliro, Piraeus, Athens, Greece.

Season by season

* In the 2019–20 season, Olympiacos B Development Team had the 2nd best record in the Greek A2 Basket League's regular season, at 17–4, but they were deducted a total of 6 points (3 wins) by the Hellenic Basketball Federation. That was due to a punishment of the senior club of Olympiacos, for its forfeiting of several Greek Basket League and Greek Cup games, during the previous 2018–19 season. As a result, Olympiacos B Development Team was placed in 6th place in the Greek A2 Basket League's 2019–20 season standings.

Players

Current roster

Depth chart

Squad changes for the 2021–2022 season

In

 (return from loan)

Out

 (on loan)
 (on loan)
 (on loan)

Notable players

Greece:
 Nikos Arsenopoulos 
 Vassilis Christidis 
 Iosif Koloveros
 Petros Melissaratos 
 Alexandros Nikolaidis 
 Thomas Nikou
 Petros Noeas
 Stathis Papadionysiou
 Andreas Petropoulos
 Dionysis Skoulidas
 Andreas Tsoumanis
 Apollon Tsochlas
 Vangelis Tzolos 
 Thomas Zevgaras 

Europe:
 Aleksej Pokuševski

Head coaches

Sponsors
Piraeus Bank

References

External links
 Official website 
 Eurobasket.com Team Profile

Olympiacos
Olympiacos B.C.
Olympiacos B.C. B
2019 establishments in Greece
Basketball teams established in 2019
Basketball teams in Greece
Sports clubs in Piraeus